Vesara is a hybrid form of Indian temple architecture, with South Indian plan and a shape that features North Indian details. This fusion style likely originated in the historic architecture schools of the Dharwad region. It is common in the surviving temples of later Chalukyas and Hoysalas in the Deccan region, particularly Karnataka. According to Indian texts, Vesara was popular in central parts of India such as between the Vindhyas and the river Krishna. It is one of six major types of Indian temple architecture found in historic texts along with Nagara, Dravida, Bhumija, Kalinga and Varata.

The term was used by ancient writers, but possibly not with the same meaning as in modern usage. For this and other reasons, it is avoided by some writers, such as Adam Hardy.  Alternative terms for the whole time span of the tradition, from the 7th to the 13th century CE, include Karnata Dravida (Hardy's choice), 'Central Indian temple architecture style', 'Deccan architecture', or for shorter periods, terms referring to local dynasties, such as "Chalukyan architecture", or more precisely Early Chalukya or Badami Chalukya architecture and Later or Kalyana Chalukya or Western Chalukya architecture, and Hoysala architecture to those built during the Hoysala dynasty rule.

Among those who do use "vesara", there is some disagreement as to what periods to use it for. Such disagreements are very largely restricted to matters of nomenclature: whether the term is useful, and if so, what it should cover, in particular whether the Early as well as the Later Chalukya is included in "Vesara". There is general agreement about most aspects of the actual surviving buildings.

Etymology

Vesara means mule, "an issue of heterogeneous parents", states Stella Kramrisch. The south Indian text Kamika-agama explains that this name is derived from its mixed nature, where it is a Dravida architecture in plan, yet its shape is Nagara architecture in the details. The same text says that Vesara is also called Sankara – "hybrid" – for the same reason.

Vesara reflects the hybrid nature of the style.

Texts
The Vesara style is not mentioned in north Indian texts on architecture, states Dhaky – a scholar of Indian temple architecture. In contrast, it is a term found in most South Indian texts on architecture along with Dravida and Nagara, something that suggests that the Vesara style emerged and was championed in the south. The Manasara categorizes Nagara to north, Dravida to south and Vesara to the middle. It goes on to state that Nagara emphasizes the four sides, Dravida a polygon (octagon), while Vesara compliments both in between with circular or elliptical forms. Given the many post-10th-century Hindu and Jain temple structures and ruins in Vesara form that have survived in Karnataka, the Vesara style has been linked to Karnataka and texts composed there.

In general, many South Indian texts state that Vesara is a building that is "circular or round" in plan above karna (base) or kantha (neck). For example, this description is found for Vesara in verse 50.15–17 of the Svayambhuva-agama, verse 7.117 of the Karana-agama, verse 12.68 of the Ajita-agama, verse 30.41 of the Suprebheda-agama and others. On the other hand, the verse 7.15 of the Dipta-agama,  the verse 9.3 of the Padma-samhita, and the verse 30.44–45 of Ishana-Sivagurudeva-Paddhati state that a Vesara may be circular, elliptical or apsidal in plan. A third view is proffered in the section 6 of the Marichi samhita, verses 18.47–48 of the Manasara, and verses 19.36–38 of the Mayamata, which states that a Vesara can be circular or it can be a square up to prastara and then is circular from griva (neck) onwards.

There are other theoretical classifications of Hindu temple architecture, with South Indian texts using the plan and North Indian texts using the overall shape and form, in particular of the superstructure. However, the real temples that were built before the 17th-century show an abundance of experimentation with core ideas, innovations and overlapping varieties that scholars generally avoid the theoretical terms. For example, while the theory in Manasara states that Dravida temples are those south Indian temples that have an octagonal (or polygonal) plan, historic Dravidian temples with octagonal plan either were never built or have not survived into the modern age. Similarly, even on the walls of Hindu and Jain temples of Karnataka, there is no depiction of elliptical temple. This may be because the sthanpati (architect) and silpins (artisans) in 9th to 11th-century Karnataka were deliberately ignoring the texts and experimenting with novel and innovative synthesis.

History

The vesara style originated in the region between the Krishna and Tungabhadra rivers that is contemporary north Karnataka. According to some art historians, the roots of Vesara style can be traced to the Chalukyas of Badami (500-753AD) whose Early Chalukya or Badami Chalukya architecture built temples in a style that mixed some features of the nagara and the dravida styles, for example using both the northern shikhara and southern vimana type of superstructure over the sanctum in different temples of similar date, as at Pattadakal. This style was further refined by the Rashtrakutas of Manyakheta (750-983AD) in sites such as Ellora. Though there is clearly a good deal of continuity with the Badami or Early Chalukya style, other writers only date the start of Vesara to the later Western Chalukyas of Kalyani (983-1195 AD), in sites such as Lakkundi, Dambal, Itagi, and Gadag, and continued by the Hoysala empire (1000-1330 AD).

Other art historians such as Sinha state that experimentation and innovations in Hindu temple architecture began quite early in Karnataka at sites such as Aihole, Pattadakal, Badami and Mahakuta where both Nagara and Dravida temples were built close to each other. However, these more or less retained their historic identity. Vesara, states Sinha, should not be considered as a simple mixture of nagara or dravida, but as an architectural invention that was difficult and a deliberate creative synthesis given the materials and construction methods available in India over the 7th to 12th-centuries. This view is supported by inscriptions discovered in the north Karnataka region. For example, at the mid-11th-century Joda-kalasha Hindu temple in Sudi – an early vesara example – is an inscription in a mix of Sanskrit and Kannada below Shaiva iconography, that mentions Somesvara I  and saka 981 (c. 1060 CE). After mentioning Hindu dynasties all over the Indian subcontinent, successful public works, ascetics and the schools of the silpins, it states in verses 16–17:

The Joda-kalasha temple thus was a challenging innovation over a trend whose earliest surviving sample is in what is now the Kukkanur village of Karnataka, the Kallesvara (Shiva) temple (1000–1025 CE). The Kukkanur temple shows most of the Dravidian features, particularly in the superstructure. The sanctum and mandapa, however, introduces a projecting bhadra with rhythmically placed thin pilasters. This thereby introduces Nagara style and takes the first step to harmonizing the relationship between how the viewer aesthetically experiences the temple from the outside and inside of the temple. This bhadra innovation required changes in how the temple was assembled and the layout of the superstructure. These changes were further perfected as the decades of the 11th-century unfolded in Karnataka. The Sudi temple was a significant step forward. The Kasivisvesvara temple in Lakkundi marked a high point of architectural and artistic accomplishment in the Vesara genre. Thereafter, many more innovations were introduced and increasingly sophisticated Kalayana Chalukya and Hoysala temples were built in the emerging Vesara-style through the 13th-century.

Description

The Vesara architecture departs from the Dravida architecture in the way it projects the bhadra, widens the sanctum (and mandapa), takes it ever closer to a rounded form, adds motifs and decoration to the outer walls, and how the temple aesthetically appears both outside and inside to the pilgrims. The Vesara form allowed the architect and artisans to add more narrative panels about the Epics, the Puranas, the Vedic legends, scenes of artha, kama, dharma (divine iconography) along with ornamentation and illustrations of different types of temple shikaras as aedicules to the outside and inside in contrast to the plain structures found in the Dravida temples of earlier centuries. Vesara architecture, thus marked a conceptual shift in both construction and how the visitor experiences the temple space.

The Vesara style (if defined as beginning only with the Western Chalukyas in the late 10th-century) contains elements of both Dravida and Nagara styles. In particular the shape of the superstructure over the sanctum is usually pyramidal in profile, and shorter than the northern shikhara tower. In plan the walls and superstructure are broadly circular, or a straight-sided cone, though its geometry is based on rotating a square imposed on a circle. It has rather different decoration and motifs to either. A common motif is in fact miniature shikharas, often of the bhumija type, showing that the architects were well aware of northern styles. Like the southern vimana superstructure, the Vesara equivalent is strongly divided into storeys or steps, but there are more of them, and the kapota roof motif that is so common in contemporary southern vimanas is less dominant.

George Michell describes a characteristic feature as "the obscuring of the outer profile of the building by multiplying the projections of the walls and superstructure; these move restlessly from one plane to another, relying upon effects of light and shade to lend the building its solidity and shape."

There are generally prominent sukanasa projections from the tower on the roof over an antarala antechamber to the sanctum. The mandapa is generally larger than the sanctum and its vimana. Further open mandapas may be larger still. Temples with more than one shrine develop, especially those with three. These are usually with three entrances off the same mandapa, as at the Chennakesava Temple, Somanathapura and Kedareshvara Temple, Balligavi; the two side shrines are at 90° to the central, main one.

Comparisons with Bhumija and Varata architectures
According to Dubey, there is no consensus in pre-13th-century Indian tradition as to how Vesara should be described or identified. The conditions and "mixed" features for Vesara are also found in Bhumija and Varata architecture, where synthesis and innovation drives the North Indian and South Indian towards being variants of each other. The discovery of early examples of elliptical, circular, apsidal Hindu temples, states Dubey, may correspond to the Vesara as they once existed and what the South Indian texts were referring to, at the time they were composed. Adam Hardy states that these inventive forms are better understood in terms of the architecture schools and their geographical context, with the note that these schools shared and competed in their ideas. Vesara evolved in Karnataka, Varata in Vidarbha-Berar region, Kalinga in Odisha, and Bhumija in Malwa.

Examples
The early Vesara temples are primarily near and between the Tungabhadra river and Krishna river before they merge. These sites include:
Kallesvara temple, Kukkanur 
Ramalingesvara temple, Gudur
Mahadeva temple, Ittagi
Kasivisvesvara temple, Lakkundi (and several other temples at Lakkundi)
Brahmadeva temple, Savadi – notable for being fully stellate
Mallikarjuna temple, Sudi (and Joda-kalasha temple)

Later Vesara temples include the Hoysala temples at Belur, Halebidu and Somnathpura are leading examples of the Vesara style.  These temples are now proposed as a UNESCO world heritage site.

Gallery

Notes

References

Bibliography
Hardy, Adam, Indian Temple Architecture: Form and Transformation : the Karṇāṭa Drāviḍa Tradition, 7th to 13th Centuries, 1995, Abhinav Publications, 9788170173120, google books
Harle, J.C., The Art and Architecture of the Indian Subcontinent, 2nd edn. 1994, Yale University Press Pelican History of Art,  
Michell, George (1988), The Hindu Temple: An Introduction to Its Meaning and Forms, University of Chicago Press,

External links
History of Indian art
Brief History of Hindu Temples

Indian architectural styles
Hindu temple architecture